The quantum Cramér–Rao bound is the quantum analogue of the classical Cramér–Rao bound. It bounds the achievable precision in parameter estimation with a quantum system:

When considering a unitary dynamics of the type

where  is the initial state of the system,  is the parameter to be estimated based on measurements on

Simple derivation from the Heisenberg uncertainty relation

Let us consider the decomposition of the density matrix to pure components as

The Heisenberg uncertainty relation is valid for all 

From these, employing the Cauchy-Schwarz inequality  we arrive at 

Here 

is the error propagation formula, which rougly tells us how well  can be estimated by measuring  Moreover, the convex roof of the variance is given as <ref 

where  is the quantum Fisher information.

References

Quantum information science
Quantum optics